Ateneo de Davao University (AdDU) is a private Catholic basic and higher education institution run by the Philippine Province of the Society of Jesus in Davao City, Davao del Sur, Philippines. It was established in 1948 when the Jesuits took over the administration of the diocesan school, St. Peter's Parochial School. The Jesuits renamed the school to "Ateneo de Davao" after taking control. The Jesuits were naming all the schools that they were opening at that time Ateneo. Ateneo de Davao is the seventh school in the country to be named as Ateneo by the Jesuits. The university has five undergraduate schools, namely the School of Arts and Sciences, School of Business and Governance, School of Engineering and Architecture, School of Education and the School of Nursing. The graduate programs are under these units as well. The College of Law is a separate unit within the university. The university also runs a grade school and high school, both Junior High and Senior High.

The university was granted "Institutional Accreditation" by the Philippine Accrediting Association of Schools, Colleges and Universities in which only six universities in the country were given such recognition, and was also granted Autonomous Status by the Commission on Higher Education (Philippines).

History
At the request of the Most Reverend Luis del Rosario, S.J., bishop of the Archdiocese of Zamboanga, which then included the Davao region, the Jesuit fathers took over St. Peter's Parochial School and founded the Ateneo de Davao in 1948. The founding fathers were led by Fr. Theodore E. Daigler S.J., who became the first rector of the school. The other founding Jesuits were Alfredo Paguia S.J., Grant Quinn S.J., Scholastics James Donelan S.J. and Rodolfo Malasmas S.J. On 20 May 1948, Ateneo de Davao was registered with the SEC (SEC Registration No. 3467) as a non-stock, non-profit, education institution.

When the Ateneo de Davao formally opened on 28 June 1948, it offered grades V and VI and 1st to 3rd year high school. There were 71 elementary students and 131 high school students who started in a wooden building on a six-hectare lot in Matina.

The Jacinto campus (3.5 hectares) was acquired in 1951 with the support of the Most Rev. Clovis Thibault, P.M.E., Bishop-Prelate of Davao. The campus provided classrooms for high school students in the daytime and college courses in the evenings. College course offerings then were liberal arts, commerce, education, associate in arts, pre-law, secretarial and an elementary teacher's certificate program. The College Department opened in July 1951 with 130 male students. College classes were held in the wooden Bellarmine Hall. In 1953, the Ateneo de Davao College became co-educational. By then, there were nine collegiate course programs offered.

University campus

The university operates in three campuses in Davao City, both housing several research and academic units. The 4-hectare campus between Roxas Avenue and Jacinto Street is the metropolitan or "downtown" campus as it is situated in the central business district of the city. When it was acquired in 1951, the Jacinto campus was only 3.5 hectares. In 2012, an adjacent 5,000 square meter lot (0.5 hectare) was added to the existing campus. The undergraduate and graduate schools of the university, including the College of Law, which have a combined population of around 8,000 students are housed in this campus.

The grade school and high school units are located at a 7.2-hectare campus in the Matina district, a residential area of the city. The Matina campus was originally a 6-hectare lot, and an adjacent 1.2 hectare lot was added to the campus in 2012. In June 2018, the Bangkal campus was opened for its senior high school unit. The senior high school campus features four school buildings and one administration building with 4  stories each.

Academic institutions

The Ateneo de Davao's academic programs include the humanities, education, accounting, business, law, social sciences, philosophy, nursing, social work, theology, biology, chemistry, mathematics, environmental science, computer science and information technology, engineering, architecture, public administration, anthropology, Islamic studies, sociology, economics and political science. The university also heavily engages itself in research and community social involvement.

Undergraduate and graduate units

School of Arts and Sciences
The School of Arts and Sciences (SAS) was opened in 1951 with 130 students enrolled in various offerings, namely: liberal arts, commerce, education, associate in arts, pre-law, secretarial, and elementary teacher's certificate program. In subsequent years, other college programs were added. After the school obtained university status in 1977, the list of programs was further expanded.

Currently, the SAS offers different degree programs both at the undergraduate and graduate levels. The SAS is subdivided into four clusters: Computer Studies, Humanities and Letters, Natural Sciences and Mathematics, and Social Sciences.

School of Business and Governance

The undergraduate business courses of the Ateneo de Davao University were under the School of Arts and Sciences; the MBA, MPA and MAN programs were under the graduate business programs and the MPA-GA program was under the Graduate School of Arts and Sciences. In an effort to have all the business courses integrated, the AdDU School of Business & Governance (SBG) was formed.

The SBG was launched on 1 April 2000. Under its aegis are accountancy, business management, entrepreneurship, human resource development and management, finance, accounting technology, marketing and graduate business programs as well as support programs in computer literacy and research and extension offices.

School of Nursing
The university began offering a master's degree program in Nursing Administration in the 1970s. It opened an undergraduate nursing program in 2001. The program started under the auspices of the Natural Sciences and Math Division, and eventually became the School of Nursing (SON).

In 2009, the Commission on Higher Education (CHEd) released a list of the top 20 nursing schools in the Philippines that have met the standards set by the Professional Regulation Commission (PRC). The School of Nursing of the Ateneo de Davao University was in the 18th place of the Top 20 Nursing Schools in the Philippines.

School of Engineering and Architecture
In school year 2010–2011, the Board of Trustees approved the separation of the Engineering and Architecture divisions from the School of Arts and Sciences, and the creation of its own college. Dr. Randell U. Espina was appointed as its first dean. The board approved the shift from CEA to School of Engineering and Architecture (SEA), beginning 1 June 2012

The SEA offers ten programs: Architecture, Aerospace Engineering, Civil Engineering, Computer Engineering, Chemical Engineering, Electronics and Communications Engineering, Electrical Engineering, Electronics Engineering, Industrial Engineering, Mechanical Engineering and Robotics Engineering.

In 2011, AdDU was adjudged the seventh best engineering school in the country. This ranking was derived from the average of the school's ratings in the licensure examinations in the five engineering fields of Electrical, Mechanical, Chemical, Civil and Electronics & Communications Engineering. The Ateneo de Davao was also ranked as the 4th best Architecture school in the country. This was also based on the passing percentage rates of the school on board examinations administered by the Professional Regulation Commission for Architecture in three consecutive years.

School of Education
During the school year 2012–2013, the board approved the separation of the Education program from the Social Science Division as part of the reorganization of the School of Arts and Sciences in order to create the School of Education (SOE). Dr. Gina L. Montalan is the school's first appointed dean. The current Dean of the SOE is Dr. Annabel J. Casumpa.

The SOE offers the following programs: Bachelor of Elementary Education (Generalist and Pre-School) and Bachelor of Secondary Education with majors in English, Math, Physical Sciences, Social Studies, and Biological Sciences.

The Ateneo de Davao University's Teacher Education is also recognized by the Commission on Higher Education as a Center of Development.

Professional unit

College of Law
In June 1961, then-Rector Rev. Hudson Mitchell, S.J. established the College of Law. The first graduates took the bar examinations in 1965. Atty. Leon M. Garcia, Jr. was Dean for the period 1961–63. He was succeeded by Epifanio Estrellado who held the deanship for 27 years. In 1990, Atty. Hildegardo F. Iñigo, one of the first graduates of the College of Law and faculty member since 1967, assumed the position of dean.

According to the Supreme Court of the Philippines, the AdDU College of Law is the fifth best law school in the country.

The present dean of the College of Law is Atty. Manuel P. Quibod, who is also the university's legal counsel.

Basic education units
The government mandated K12 basic education program was implemented in the university starting in school year 2012–2013.

Senior High School
The Senior High School covers three areas based on disciplines similar to college courses which are all Academic: Accountancy, Business & Management (ABM), Science Technology Engineering & Mathematics (STEM), and Humanities & Social Sciences (HUMSS). These areas allow students to choose the strand where they can prepare for college.

The first two school years of the Senior High School which began in June 2016, was temporarily held in the college campus in Jacinto while the permanent and current site was being constructed in the Bangkal. In June 2018, although the new Bangkal campus was only about 90% complete, formal classes in Senior High School were already held in the location.

The Senior High School is headed by the Director, Ricardo P. Enriquez, MPA. Its Assistant Principal for Formation is Fr. Jessel Gerard "JBoy" M. Gonzales, SJ.

Junior high school
 
The Junior High School (JHS) Unit's current principal Camila V. Samblaceño assumed the post on 1 April 2020, replacing Fr. Michael I. Pineda, S.J. after his nine years of service in the campus.

The JHS main library is housed on the second floor of the administration building. It also has a Student Development Center which supports the educative process through by controlling and directing student activities. Some of the goals of the center are incorporated in the academic curriculum which include individual analysis of the student, information and career development, individual counseling, and the conduct of regular psychological educational classes. Another support service in the JHS is the Instructional Media Center (IMC) which aims to provide an environment that facilitates academic excellence and the formation of Christian values. The IMC has a collection of print and audio-visual materials such as books, magazines, records, videotapes and other resources.

As part of the Jesuit educational tradition, the JHS also provides religious formation programs, such as the Christian Service and Learning Program (CSLP, formerly called CSIP), by sending its students to other communities in order to immerse themselves in the environment. The academic curriculum also includes a Christian Life Education (CLE) program. CLE courses, which are spread over four years, aim to produce Ateneo graduates who embodies the Jesuit values of being men and women for others and who can be catalysts for social transformation while living life with informed Christian perspectives.

The JHS classifies its students into honors (St. Francis Xavier) and general sections (St. John Berchmans - general section in 7th, 9th and 10th Grade and honors class in the 8th Grade, St. Robert Bellarmine, St. Francis Borgia, St. Peter Canisius, St. Edmund Campion, St. Noel Chabanel (7th Grade), St. John de Brito, St. Peter Favre, St. Aloysius Gonzaga, St. Isaac Jogues, St. Stanislaus Kostka, St. Joseph Pignatelli, St. Bernardino Realino (7th Grade), St. John Francis Regis). Students entering the 7th Grade are all placed in regular sections. Starting with the 8th Grade, they are academically evaluated and ranked in order to determine the composition of the batch's honors class. The latter's curriculum is more advanced and rigorous. For instance, the math curriculum of the honors class has additional competencies such as analytic geometry (8th Grade), trigonometry (9th Grade), and calculus (10th Grade)

Grade School
The Ateneo de Davao Grade School is housed, along with the Junior high school in the Matina Campus. The grade school's Wellness and Testing Center (WTC, formerly SDC or Student Development Center) offers integral student development programs. The Instructional Media Center (IMC) is the information center of the Grade School. The Ateneo Education for Elementary Gifted Student (Ateneo EDGES) Program caters to pupils who are gifted in English, Science, and Math.

Library system
The library system of the Ateneo de Davao University comprises several libraries housed in the Jacinto Campus and the Matina Campus. The main library of the tertiary level is located inside the Gisbert Hall, in the Jacinto Campus. The main library has four levels and mainly serves the School of Arts and Sciences, School of Business and Governance, and the College of Nursing. The first level of the main library accommodates the space for the study area, newly processed books, general circulation books, CD-ROM library, PROQUEST, and the Online Public Access Catalog (OPAC). The second level contains the Union Card Catalog and the Graduate and Reserved Sections which contain theses, dissertations, and other studies that are requested by the members of the faculty for their classes. The third level includes the Reference and Filipiniana Library and a self-regulating computer library for the students. The fourth level houses the Periodical Library which provides a vast collection of current and retrospective newspapers, magazines, and journals.

The Law School and School of Business and Governance Graduate Library is located on the fifth floor of the Dotterweich building. Its collection largely caters to law students and graduate students who are enrolled in the Master of Arts in Business Administration (MBA), Master in Public Administration (MPA) and Doctor in Business Administration (DBA) programs.

The Faculty Resource Center (FRC) is located on the second level of the Finster Hall. The resources in the FRC are exclusively used by the faculty members of the university. It also contains its own computer laboratory.

Also integrated in the library system of the Ateneo de Davao are the distinct libraries of the preschool, grade school, and high school departments. These three libraries are all located in the Matina Campus. The Ateneo de Davao Library System is connected to the library system of its sister schools all over the Philippines namely Ateneo de Manila University, Ateneo de Naga University, Ateneo de Zamboanga University, and the Ateneo de Cagayan University.

The American Corner (AC), or the "American Library" as it is widely known in the city, is located on the second level of the Wieman Hall.

American Studies Resource Center
The American Studies Resource Center or the American Corner (AC) is a center dedicated to providing various materials and resources about the United States in different aspects, as well as advising services for those individuals who want to study in the United States.

Service-oriented programs
The Arrupe Office of Social Formation (AOSF), formerly known as the Social Involvement Coordinating Office (SICO), is the social formation arm of the Ateneo de Davao University in the tertiary level. It is responsible for developing students, faculty, and non-teaching staff to be leaders in service of the marginalized and the vulnerable. The office is also responsible for the promotion of faith that does justice following the teachings and examples of Christ and the spirituality of St. Ignatius. Moreover, it aims to develop and implement social formation programs and activities intended to help the poor such as outreach programs, immersion sessions, and social workshops.

Among AOSF's projects and initiatives include the "First Year Development Program", where students are assigned to a classroom adviser who assists them in adjusting to the demands and rigours of college life. Another is the "National Service Training Program", where Filipino students contribute to the general welfare of local partner communities. Lastly, the "Student Servant Leadership Program", where students develop and student organizations serve as collaborators in the work of spreading social awareness and social involvement. It also runs surveys in the public interest and patrols elections.

The College of Law has several pro bono programs under the office of the Ateneo Legal Aid Services. Students in the graduate programs of the School of Business and Governance help in creating business plans and entrepreneurial opportunities for non-profit organizations in the city. For the School of Arts and Sciences graduate programs, most of the academic courses are focused on environment, education, and peace in its various academic course programs. In line with this, the university has its very own Al Qalam Institute for Islamic Studies.

Accreditation and recognition
In 2009, Ateneo de Davao was granted "institutional accreditation" by the Philippine Accrediting Association of Schools, Colleges and Universities (PAASCU). Only six universities in the Philippines were granted and it is the only university in Mindanao to have been given such recognition. The Ateneo de Davao University joins five other universities in the Philippines that have been granted with such accreditation namely, Ateneo de Manila University, Ateneo de Naga University, Centro Escolar University, Silliman University and Trinity University of Asia. AdDU was also given Autonomous Status by the Commission on Higher Education and is also a Center of Development for Information Technology and Teacher Education.

In 2016, Ateneo de Davao was granted "Autonomous and Deregulated Status" by the Commission on Higher Education (Philippines).

The Ateneo de Davao University has been re-accredited Level III in eight programs which are: Accounting, Arts & Sciences, Business, Electronics & Communication Engineering, Elementary Education, Secondary Education, Civil Engineering and Chemical Engineering and is accredited Level III for Industrial Engineering, Electrical Engineering, Mechanical Engineering and Computer Science by the Philippine Accrediting Association of Schools, Colleges and Universities and the Federation of Accrediting Agencies of the Philippines. The Information Technology and Information Systems programs of AdDU were both granted Level I accreditation and is a Center of Development of CHED XI. Certificates of Accreditation from PAASCU were also awarded to the following programs offered by the Ateneo: Arts & Sciences, Elementary Education, Secondary Education, Business, Accounting, Engineering (Civil, Chemical, Electrical, Mechanical), Information Technology/Information Systems and Social Work. Some programs offered by the university are also under the Candidate Status of PAASCU. In addition, the Elementary and High School of AdDU are also accredited by the same accrediting association and received level II accreditation.

Rankings (Local / National / International)

 Ateneo de Davao University is the fifth-best university in the Philippines according to the 2023 Quacquarelli-Symonds (QS) Philippine University Ranking. It ranks 557th out of 760 Asian universities in the Asian region, according to the 2023 Quacquarelli-Symonds (QS) Asia University Ranking. 
  
Ateneo got into the list of the QS World University Rankings for 2013 per subject area in Higher Education Institutions in the country. AdDU topped in four subject areas in the QS ranking, specifically in Arts & Humanities: English Language and Literature, Engineering & Technology: Computer Science and Information Systems, Psychology and Sociology, joining other universities in the country namely Ateneo de Manila University, University of the Philippines, De La Salle University, University of Santo Tomas and Mindanao State University - Iligan Institute of Technology.
 The Ateneo de Davao joined the roster of world universities in the 2012 QS World University Subject Ranking for English Language and Literature joining Oxford and Harvard, wherein it landed on the 101-150 bracket. It was not on the equivalent 2016 list.
 In the national rankings done by the Commission on Higher Education and the Professional Regulation Commission based on cumulative data from 1991 to 2001 of average passing rates in all courses of all Philippine colleges and universities in licensure examinations, Ateneo de Davao University was proclaimed as the 5th top university in the country.
 On a review and ranking by the 4 International Colleges and Universities - an international higher education directory and search engine which reviews accredited world universities and colleges, which was updated in 2014, Ateneo de Davao University got the 14th spot in the list of Top Universities in the Philippines. The ranking is not academic, rather, it is based upon an algorithm including three unbiased and independent web metrics extracted from three different search engines. The significance of such ranking according to uniRank is to help international students and academic staff to understand how popular a specific university or college is in a foreign country.
 Based on the research and web survey of the Webometrics Ranking of World Universities 2014 - produced by Cybermetrics Lab (CCHS), a unit of the Spanish National Research Council (CSIC), the main public research body in Spain, Ateneo de Davao landed on the 14th spot in the list of the top universities in the Philippines.
 On a local survey of Davao Reader, a Davao City Online Magazine, Ateneo de Davao is the top school in the city and is the most preferred school by company heads and owners in getting personnel and professionals to work for their companies. In another evaluation done by Davao Eagle Online, AdDU also emerged as the top school in Davao City. This ranking was based on the number of PRC board topnotchers in 2013.

University radio station
Blue Knight FM, the official radio station of the university, was launched in January 2008. The station serves as a training ground for Mass Communication majors.

Notable alumni
Ateneo de Davao has produced graduates in the fields of arts, governance, law, medicine, media, service and science. Here are some of its notable alumni:
 Ernesto Abella -  businessman, writer, and former evangelist serving as Undersecretary for Strategic Communications and Research of the Department of Foreign Affairs since 2017
 Joey Ayala -  singer, songwriter and former chairman of the music committee of the National Commission for Culture and the Arts.
 Antonio T. Carpio  - Senior Associate Justice, Supreme Court of the Philippines
 Leoncio P. Deriada - writer
 Thor Dulay - a singer-songwriter and vocal coach
 Jesus Dureza - lawyer, consultant, journalist and politician
 Sebastian Duterte - politician and mayor of Davao City
 Juris Fernandez - singer
 Jonathan Aguilar Garcia - comedian, actor and TV host
 Conrado "Bobby" Gempesaw - 17th and 1st lay president of St. John's University in Queens, New York City
 Henri Jean Paul Inting - the 183rd Supreme Court Associate Justice
 Jasmine Bacurnay Lee - a Filipino-born Korean television personality, actress, civil servant and politician
 Emmylou Taliño-Mendoza - politician
 Prospero Nograles - former Speaker of the Philippine House of Representatives

See also
 List of Jesuit sites

References

External links
Official website

Jesuit universities and colleges in the Philippines
Universities and colleges in Davao City
Nursing schools in the Philippines
Educational institutions established in 1948
1948 establishments in the Philippines
Schools in Davao City